FenixEdu is a software project focused on developing open source software for schools. The core development team currently works out of Instituto Superior Técnico, Lisbon.

The goal of this project is to develop a large suite of software products that schools can easily install and configure on their own organization, with very little resources. The project also works as advanced engineering training group for students of Instituto Superior Técnico, by giving them a realistic software development environment without the real pressures of a job. The motivation behind it is that by optimising the teaching process, there are increases in the speed of science and culture development and by doing so there is a faster societal development.

History

The project started around 1999 when Instituto Superior Técnico felt the need of updating their student information systems, written originally in COBOL. The school started Project Fénix as a research project involving several final degree projects with the objective to create a new software platform, called Fénix, that would serve the school in their administrative needs. Right from the beginning the project released its software as open source, as a way for the academic community to contribute back and also for the system to serve as a teaching tool, particularly to Software Engineering students. Over the next 12 years the project grew to manage almost all the school tasks, from grading to parking.

Although the system by 2012 covered a lot of school tasks, it was a monolithic platform, and was very hard to deploy it on another schools, requiring a team of specialized developers to do it. It was around this time, when the system started growing beyond one school, that the project restructured it, and rebranded itself into FenixEdu. The focus was to develop easy deployable, highly modular, pluggable and customizable pieces of software that schools could cherry pick to match their needs, requiring no more than one person to fully configure an installation. Over the next years, the original platform source code was cleaned, Instituto Superior Técnico specific code removed and sliced into individual modules, that could be reused and picked individually.

Projects
As of 2014, FenixEdu released four individual software packages:

 FenixEdu Academic, an open source Student Information System
 FenixEdu Learning, an open source Learning Management System
 OddJet, a reporting library designed to work with OpenOffice documents.
 Bennu, a web framework integrated with the Fenix Framework persistence system.

See also
 FenixEdu Academic
 FenixEdu Learning
 Free Software Foundation
 Open Software Foundation
 List of learning management systems

References

External links 
 
 Information about FenixEdu
 Projecto Fénix old documentation site
 

Free and open-source software organizations